False Evidence may refer to:

 False evidence, information created or obtained illegally, to sway the verdict in a court case
 False Evidence (1919 film), 1919 American silent drama film directed by Edwin Carewe 
 False Evidence (1922 film), 1922 British silent film directed by Harold M. Shaw
 False Evidence (1937 film), 1937 British crime film directed by Donovan Pedelty